George Barclay (born 1 April 1935 in Elephant & Castle, London, England) is a former speedway rider who started his career with the West Ham Hammers in the British League in 1966. 

Barclay joined the Sunderland Stars in 1971 and remained with them until their closure in 1974. 

Barclay has been the driving force of the opening of the National Speedway Museum in Broxbourne in Hertfordshire.

References 

1937 births
Living people
British speedway riders
English motorcycle racers
King's Lynn Stars riders
West Ham Hammers riders
Sunderland Stars riders
Rayleigh Rockets riders
Rye House Rockets riders
Crayford Kestrels riders
Swindon Robins riders
Canterbury Crusaders riders
Wembley Lions riders
Exeter Falcons riders
Hackney Hawks riders